Matthew Kelly (born David Allan Kelly, 9 May 1950) is an English actor and presenter. Having been trained as a theatre actor, he first came to public prominence as a television presenter of ITV light entertainment shows such as Game for a Laugh, You Bet! and Stars in Their Eyes. In the 2000s he returned to acting, appearing in several West End productions, while also acting in some television roles.

Early life
Kelly was born in Urmston, Lancashire. As a child, he lived on Primrose Avenue in the town and became interested in acting when at the Urmston Musical Theatre, most notably playing the role of Louis in a production of The King and I in 1963. He continues to be President of the theatre group.

After 1961, Kelly went to Urmston Grammar School. He trained as an actor at the Manchester Polytechnic School of Theatre (now Manchester School of Theatre, part of Manchester Metropolitan University) and joined a theatre group which included Julie Walters and Pete Postlethwaite. After graduation, he made his professional debut at the Pavilion Theatre in Rhyl. After this debut he appeared regularly at Liverpool's Everyman Theatre. He is a former member of the Workers' Revolutionary Party.

Career
Kelly's first major TV appearances were in the ITV sitcom Holding the Fort (1980–82) and as a panellist in the game show Punchlines (1981–84) hosted by Lennie Bennett on ITV but he became famous as part of the original presenting team on Game for a Laugh for the same producers and network. In 1983 he was the original presenter of Children's ITV (CITV) when launched in January of the same year - and returned to the role sporadically over the next few years. He was the subject of an edition of This Is Your Life in 1983 when he was surprised by Eamonn Andrews in London's Trafalgar Square. For the next 14 years his work centred on light entertainment shows such as Kelly's Eye (TVS sketch show 1985), You Bet! (LWT/ITV) (1991–95) and, most notably, Stars in Their Eyes (Granada/ITV), which he took over from Russ Abbot, who was brought in as a temporary host after original presenter Leslie Crowther suffered serious head injuries in a car crash in October 1992. Abbot had only hosted one episode, an Elvis Presley special. However, it later became apparent that Crowther would not be able to return, as he retired in 1994, and then died two years later. Therefore, Kelly became the permanent host of the show until he left in March 2004. Simultaneously, he was narrator for the ITV series After They Were Famous from 1999 to 2005. He continued to act occasionally, notably in the Channel 4 comedy Relative Strangers, and in the theatre production of The Cabinet of Dr. Caligari.

Following his departure from Stars in Their Eyes Kelly returned to acting full-time. He has appeared in a number of television and theatre productions. In 2005, he was a member of the cast in BBC One's Bleak House as Mr. Turveydrop. He also played a serial killer in 2005's Cold Blood and its 2007 sequel, as well as the explorer Giovanni Belzoni in BBC One's Egypt. On the stage he won an Olivier Award in 2004 for his portrayal of Lennie in John Steinbeck's Of Mice and Men at the Savoy Theatre. Other work includes Ripafratta in Mirandolina at the Royal Exchange Theatre in August 2006 which he swiftly followed by appearing as a well-received Antonio Salieri in Peter Shaffer's play Amadeus. For a short period in summer 2007 he played the character Willie Thorn in the farce Out For Justice in Sydney, Australia's Royal Court Theatre. The play was a huge success and writer Vicky Ledbrook was quoted as saying Kelly is one of the finest comic actors of his generation.

From December 2008 to January 2009, he joined Stefanie Powers, Craig McLachlan and Christopher Biggins at the Mayflower Theatre in Southampton to play May, one of the ugly sisters, in the pantomime Cinderella alongside his son Matthew Rixon. In 2009, he was on stage to high critical acclaim, in Howard Barker's Victory: Choices in Reaction, at the Arcola Theatre, then as George in Who's Afraid of Virginia Woolf at the Garrick Theatre, Lichfield, followed by a season at London's Trafalgar Studios. The summer was spent as Pandarus in Shakespeare's Troilus and Cressida at the Globe in London. He opened in Comedians at the Lyric Theatre, Hammersmith, in October 2009.

In January 2010, he replaced Simon Callow as Pozzo in the revival of Waiting for Godot at the Theatre Royal, Haymarket, alongside Ian McKellen (Estragon), Roger Rees (Vladimir) and Ronald Pickup (Lucky). He continued in the successful production of Waiting for Godot at the Comedy Theatre, Melbourne, in May 2010.

In November 2010, Kelly was awarded an honorary doctorate by the University of Chester. In March 2012, he returned to mainstream television by appearing in the ITV comedy Benidorm, playing Cyril Babcock, a judge for the hotel's dance competition; he reprised the role in 2014. During the 2012 Edinburgh Festival Fringe, he played the role of Frank in a production of the play Educating Rita. In 2014, Kelly acted in a short drama called Cherry Cake, and in 2016, he played a one-off role of a carer/grandad in the TV series Casualty. In 2018, he hosted the documentary series Top of the Box. In September 2019, Kelly appeared as the Toy Shop owner in the stage production of Big.

Personal life
Kelly married Sarah Grey in 1975. They have mostly lived separately, he in London and she in Cheshire, but remain married.

In January 2003, Kelly was arrested by police over allegations of child sex abuse, which arose as part of Operation Arundel. The following month he was cleared of all charges. In response to his public arrest, and the later media fallout that drew public criticism, his treatment was raised as a motion in Parliament to consider "ways to protect the anonymity of those investigated until formally charged with an offence." This was later debated within Parliament as part of a wider response to investigations into allegations of historical crimes. In the same year, Kelly appeared on The Frank Skinner Show to discuss the host's jokes, which took aim at his alleged abuse of children.

References

External links 
 

1950 births
Alumni of Manchester Metropolitan University
Alumni of the Open University
British Trotskyists
English game show hosts
English male stage actors
English male television actors
English television presenters
ITV people
Laurence Olivier Award winners
Living people
People acquitted of sex crimes
People educated at Urmston Grammar
People from Urmston
Workers Revolutionary Party (UK) members